In algebra, n-ary associativity is a generalization of the associative law to n-ary operations. Ternary associativity is

 (abc)de = a(bcd)e = ab(cde),

i.e. the string abcde with any three adjacent elements bracketed.  n-ary associativity is a string of length n + (n − 1) with any n adjacent elements bracketed.

References

Properties of binary operations